Delphacidae is a family of planthoppers containing about 2000 species, distributed worldwide. Delphacids are separated from other "hoppers" by the prominent spur on the tibia of the hindleg.

Diet and Pest species
All species are phytophagous, many occurring on various grasses.  Some species are significant pests and important vectors for cereal pathogens; for example:
 The rice brown planthopper, Nilaparvata lugens (Stål)
 The white-backed planthopper (rice), Sogatella furcifera (Horváth, 1899)
 The sugarcane planthopper, Perkinsiella saccharicida Kirkaldy, 1903

Subfamilies, tribes and selected genera
Fulgoromorpha Lists On the Web includes the following tribes and genera (complete lists where tribe unassigned):

Asiracinae
Auth.: Motschulsky, 1863
 Tribe Asiracini Motschulsky, 1863
 Tribe Eodelphacini Emeljanov, 1995
 Tribe Idiosystatini Emeljanov, 1995
 Tribe Neopunanini Emeljanov, 1995
 Tribe Platysystatini Emeljanov, 1995
 Tribe Tetrasteirini Emeljanov, 1995
 Tribe Ugyopini Fennah, 1979

Delphacinae
Auth.: Leach, 1815 - world-wide, selected genera:
 Tribe Delphacini Leach, 1815
 Aloha Kirkaldy, 1904
 Criomorphus Curtis, 1833
 Delphacinus Fieber, 1866
 Delphacodes Fieber, 1866 (synonym Delphax Latreille, 1807)
 Javesella Fennah, 1963
 Kakuna Matsumura, 1935
 Megamelus Fieber, 1866
 Metadelphax Wagner, 1963
 Muellerianella Wagner, 1963
 Muirodelphax Wagner, 1963
 Nilaparvata Distant, 1906
 Nothodelphax Fennah, 1963
 Paraliburnia Jensen-Haarup, 1917
 Prokelisia Osborn, 1905
 Pseudaraeopus Kirkaldy, 1904 - synonym Delphacodes Melichar, 1901
 Sogatella Fennah, 1956
 Toya Distant, 1906
 Xanthodelphax Wagner, 1963 
 Tribe Saccharosydnini Vilbaste, 1968
Lacertinella (Remes Lenicov & Rossi Batiz) 2011
Neomalaxa Muir, 1918
Pseudomacrocorupha Muir, 1930
Saccharosydne Kirkaldy, 1907
 Tribe Tropidocephalini Muir, 1915
 Tropidocephala Stål, 1853

Kelisiinae 
Auth.: Wagner, 1963
 Anakelisia Wagner, 1963
 Kelisia Fieber, 1866

Plesiodelphacinae 
Auth.: Asche, 1985 - neotropical
 Burnilia Muir & Giffard, 1924
 Plesiodelphax Asche, 1985

Stenocraninae 
Auth.: Wagner, 1963
 Embolophora Stål, 1853
 Frameus Bartlett, 2010
Kelisicranus Bartlett, 2006
 Obtusicranus Bartlett, 2006
 Preterkelisia Yang, 1989
 Proterosydne Kirkaldy, 1907
 Stenocranus Fieber, 1866 - type genus
 Stenokelisia Ribaut, 1934
 Tanycranus Bartlett, 2010
 Terauchiana Matsumura, 1915

Vizcayinae 
Auth.: Asche, 1990 – SE Asia
 Neovizcaya Liang, 2002
 Vizcaya Muir, 1917 - type genus

Subfamily not placed 
 †Amagua Cockerell, 1924
 Epunka Matsumura, 1935
 Eunycheuma Yang, 1989
 Hikona Matsumura, 1935
 Jugodina Schumacher, 1915
 Lauriana Ren & Qin, 2014
 Megamelodes Le Quesne, 1960
 Nephropsia Costa, 1862
 Sogatodes Fennah, 1963
 Unkana Matsumura, 1935

References

 

 
Fulgoromorpha
Auchenorrhyncha families